Ludlow Mountain is a mountain located in Ludlow, Vermont.  Okemo Mountain Resort is a ski resort located on Ludlow Mountain. Before becoming a popular ski resort destination, Ludlow was originally a mill town, and was the home of a General Electric plant until 1977.

References

Mountains of Vermont
Mountains of Windsor County, Vermont